Mizanur Rahman Dawn (born 5 May 1979) is a former association football player from Bangladesh. He played for the Bangladesh national football team. He played for Bangladesh in the 1999 SAFF Championship where he was among the four top scorers in the competition. After retiring he was part of the Mohammedan Dhaka coaching panel.

International goals

Bangladesh
Scores and results list Bangladesh's goal tally first.

Honours

Bangladesh
South Asian Games Gold medal: 1999

References

1979 births
Bangladeshi footballers
Bangladesh international footballers
Living people
Association football forwards
Muktijoddha Sangsad KC players
Mohammedan SC (Dhaka) players
Brothers Union players
Abahani Limited (Dhaka) players
Arambagh KS players
Rahmatganj MFS players
Bangladeshi football managers
Bangladeshi football coaches
Bangladesh Football Premier League managers